The Season of the Witch is a novel by James Leo Herlihy. The story is written in the form of a journal that spans three months in the life of teenage runaway Gloria Glyczwycz during the autumn of 1969.

Plot summary

Gloria decides to run away from home with her gay friend John McFadden. Both of them have a reason to leave: Gloria wants to find her estranged father, and John wants to avoid being drafted and being sent to Vietnam. They head from Belle Woods, a fictional suburb of Detroit, Michigan, to New York City, where they meet a host of colorful characters. The novel explores casual drug use, draft evasion, homosexuality, and incest.

Notes

References 
 James Leo Herlihy Papers, University of Delaware

Novels by James Leo Herlihy
Fiction set in 1969
1971 American novels
Novels set in Michigan
Novels set in New York City
Novels with gay themes
1970s LGBT novels